Ramūnas Šiškauskas (born September 10, 1978) is a former Lithuanian professional basketball player and basketball coach. At a listed height of 6'6" (1.98 m) tall, 
he could play at both the shooting guard and small forward positions. His individual accolades as a player include a EuroLeague MVP award, four All-EuroLeague Team selections, as well as an All-EuroBasket Team designation. On May 16, 2014, Šiškauskas was named a EuroLeague Basketball Legend.

During his playing career, Šiškauskas won two EuroLeague titles, one each with Panathinaikos Athens and CSKA Moscow, in 2007 and 2008, and reached two more EuroLeague Finals with CSKA, in 2009 and 2012. He was a member of the senior Lithuanian national team that won the gold medal at the EuroBasket 2003. As a member of Lithuania's national team, he also won the bronze medal at the 2000 Summer Olympics, and the bronze medal at the EuroBasket 2007.

Professional playing career

Lithuania
Šiškauskas made his pro debut with Sakalai in 1996. He played two seasons with the club, averaging 11.3 points, on 60 percent shooting.

In 1998, Šiškauskas signed with Lietuvos Rytas of Vilnius. He played there until the 2003–04 season, and led the team to Lithuanian League titles in 2000 and 2002, and a Northern Europe League title in 2002. In 2002–03, he had his most successful season, averaging 16.4 points, on 68 percent shooting, and 3.4 rebounds.

Italy
Šiškauskas joined Benetton Treviso in 2004. He led them to an Italian League title in 2006, where he was named the Finals MVP, and to an Italian Cup title in 2005. He played in 32 EuroLeague games over two seasons with Benetton, and averaged 12.3 points, on 60 percent shooting.

Greece
In 2006, Šiškauskas signed with Panathinaikos, and he helped them win the EuroLeague in 2007. He averaged 11 points, on 51 percent shooting for the championship team. With Panathinaikos, he also won a Greek League title, and the Greek Cup, in 2007.

Russia
Šiškauskas joined CSKA Moscow in 2007. He helped to lead them to a EuroLeague title in 2008, and helped them reach the EuroLeague Final in 2009. Which, however, CSKA lost to Šiškauskas' former team, Panathinaikos. On May 1, 2009, he scored a career-high 29 points against Barcelona. Šiškauskas also won five Russian Championship titles (2008, 2009, 2010, 2011, 2012).

On May 13, 2012, Šiškauskas missed two vital free-throws, with 10 seconds remaining in CSKA's EuroLeague Finals game against Olympiacos Piraeus, which proved crucial in CSKA's 62 to 61 loss. He also missed the last second three-point shot in CSKA's EuroLeague Finals game against Panathinaikos, on May 3, 2009, which meant that CSKA lost that final, by a score of 73 to 71.

Only one week after the 2012 EuroLeague Finals game, on May 21, 2012, Šiškauskas announced his retirement from playing professional basketball. On May 16, 2014, Šiškauskas was named a EuroLeague Basketball Legend.

National team career

Lithuanian junior national team
Šiškauskas played with the junior national teams of Lithuania. With Lithuania's junior national team, he played at the 1998 FIBA Europe Under-20 Championship.

Lithuanian senior national team
Šiškauskas was a member of the senior men's Lithuanian national basketball teams that won the bronze medal at the 2000 Summer Olympics, and the bronze medal at the EuroBasket 2007. He was also a member of the Lithuanian team that won the gold medal at the EuroBasket 2003. He also played at the EuroBasket 2001, at the 2004 Summer Olympics, at the EuroBasket 2005, and at the 2008 Summer Olympics.

After the 2008 Summer Olympics, he officially announced that he was stepping down from the Lithuanian National Team, as a player.

Player profile
Šiškauskas was a physical small forward (198 cm or 6'6" tall), who could also easily play, both on offense and defense, in either the point guard or shooting guard positions, on the wing, and also in the paint. His excellent leaping ability, and his quickness, made him a surprising shot blocker, and one of the best one-on-one players and swingmen in Europe. He was considered the best defensive player of the senior Lithuanian national basketball team. He led the 2003–04 season of the Lithuanian League, in free throw percentage (90.6%).

Coaching career
Šiškauskas began his basketball coaching career in 2017, when he became an assistant coach of the senior men's Lithuanian national basketball team.

Awards and achievements

Pro playing career

 2× Lithuanian League Champion: (2000, 2002)
 2× Lithuanian League MVP: (2001, 2002)
 Lithuanian League Finals MVP: (2001)
 4× Lithuanian League All-Star: (2001, 2002, 2003, 2004)
 North European League: Champion (2002)
 Italian Cup Winner: (2005)
 Italian League Champion: (2006)
 Italian League Finals MVP: (2006)
 Greek Cup Winner: (2007)
 4× All-EuroLeague Team:
 3× All-EuroLeague Second Team: (2007, 2009, 2010)
 All-EuroLeague First Team: (2008)
 2× EuroLeague Champion: (2007, 2008)
 Greek League Champion: (2007)
 Triple Crown Champion: (2007)
 Greek League Best Five: (2007)
 Lithuanian Sportsman of the Year: (2007)
 EuroLeague MVP: (2008)
 5× Russian League Champion: (2008, 2009, 2010, 2011, 2012)
 Russian League Player of the Year: (2009)
 VTB United League Final Four MVP: (2008)
 All-Europe Player of the Year: (2008)
 EuroLeague 2000–10 All-Decade Team: (2010)
 Russian Cup: Winner (2010)
 Russian League All-Star: (2011)
 Russian League All-Symbolic Second Team: (2011)
 3× VTB United League Champion: (2008, 2010, 2012)
 EuroLeague Basketball Legend: (2014)

Lithuanian senior national team as a player

 2000 Summer Olympics: 
 EuroBasket 2003: 
 EuroBasket 2007: 
 EuroBasket 2007: All-Tournament Team

Career statistics

EuroLeague

|-
| style="text-align:left;" | 2004–05
| style="text-align:left;" | Benetton
| 17 || 10 || 25.8 || .487 || .286 || .700 || 2.4 || 1.5 || 1.4 || .1 || 12.5 || 11.8
|-
| style="text-align:left;" | 2005–06
| style="text-align:left;" | Benetton
| 15 || 13 || 29.2 || .516 || .419 || .711 || 2.8 || 1.9 || 1.4 || .1 || 12.0 || 13.5
|-
| style="text-align:left;background:#AFE6BA;" | 2006–07†
| style="text-align:left;" | Panathinaikos
| 20 || 19 || 26.2 || .489 || .471 || .706 || 2.5 || 1.1 || 1.1 || .3 || 10.9 || 11.6
|-
| style="text-align:left;background:#AFE6BA;" | 2007–08†
| style="text-align:left;" | CSKA
| 24 || 23 || 27.3 || .510 || .442 || .846 || 3.2 || 1.4 || 1.1 || .4 || 14.0 || 16.0
|-
| style="text-align:left;" | 2008–09
| style="text-align:left;" | CSKA
| 18 || 14 || 28.4 || .446 || .348 || .863 || 3.0 || 1.7 || .8 || .3 || 12.1 || 13.9
|-
| style="text-align:left;" | 2009–10
| style="text-align:left;" | CSKA
| 21 || 21 || 30.9 || .557 || style="background:#CFECEC;"|.550 || .765 || 4.0 || 3.0 || 1.2 || .3 || 13.4 || 17.0
|-
| style="text-align:left;" | 2010–11
| style="text-align:left;" | CSKA
| 7 || 6 || 24.9 || .422 || .348 || .500 || 4.0 || .9 || 1.3 || .1 || 7.0 || 8.9
|-
| style="text-align:left;" | 2011–12
| style="text-align:left;" | CSKA
| 21 || 21 || 22.9 || .449 || .393 || .690 || 2.2 || 1.0 || 0.6 || .0 || 7.5 || 6.7
|- class="sortbottom"
| style="text-align:left;"| Career
| style="text-align:left;"|
| 143 || 127 || 27.1 || .493 || .419 || .767 || 3.0 || 1.6 || 1.1 || .2 || 11.6 || 10.9

References

External links

 Ramūnas Šiškauskas at draftexpress.com
 Ramūnas Šiškauskas at euroleague.net
 
 Ramūnas Šiškauskas at legabasket.it 

1978 births
Living people
Basketball players at the 2000 Summer Olympics
Basketball players at the 2004 Summer Olympics
Basketball players at the 2008 Summer Olympics
BC Rytas players
FIBA EuroBasket-winning players
Greek Basket League players
Lithuanian men's basketball players
Lithuanian basketball coaches
Lithuanian Sportsperson of the Year winners
Medalists at the 2000 Summer Olympics
Olympic basketball players of Lithuania
Olympic bronze medalists for Lithuania
Olympic medalists in basketball
Pallacanestro Treviso players
Panathinaikos B.C. players
PBC CSKA Moscow players
People from Kaišiadorys
Shooting guards
Small forwards